FAMOS (short for fast analysis and monitoring of signals) is a graphical data analysis program 
for image analysis, evaluating and visually displaying measurement results. The program was introduced in 1987 by the German company imc Test & Measurement GmbH (integrated measurement & control) in Berlin for Windows 3.11. According to its manufacturer, FAMOS offers high speed display and processing of data sets of any size.

Import of a wide variety of data formats 
FAMOS can import data from different file formats, e.g. Excel-, Binary-, or ASCII-files. With a file assistant it is also possible to create different import filters. It is possible to present the data in different graphical ways. The information can be combined, labeled and processed. 
FAMOS is able to store data in a proprietary as well as in ASCII or Excel  format.

Data analysis  
Imported data can be processed with a variety of mathematical operations, either manually or in automated procedures. FAMOS offers expansion modules for special operations such as electronic filters, for spectral analysis and for synchronized display of data and video sequences and for the ASAM-ODS data model. It is also possible to play data back audibly with the PC sound card.

Documentation 
By means of its "Report Generator", FAMOS enables creation of documentations / lab reports  consisting of a variety of dialog elements and plots as well as graphics with controls which can be automatically hidden when printing. The reports generated can be subject to post-processing using various input data, and there are templates for partially or fully automated composition of reports.

Literature (German language) 
 20 Jahre imc und ADDITIVE, sensor report 4/2008
 FAMOS 6.0 - Mehr als nur Signalanalyse, Physik Journal 6/2008
 Neue Software-Version für die Analyse von Messsignalen, ATZ 4/2008
 Signalanalyse für den Messtechniker, TECHNICA 23-24/2005
 Signalanalysesoftware mit neuen Funktionen, Maschinenmarkt 17/2008
 Wie ein Taschenrechner, MSR Magazin 11/2002
 FAMOS - Taschenrechner für die Meßtechnik, Addison-Wesley, 1997,

References

External links 
- FAMOS website
- FAMOS Script for Strain Rosette calculations

Science software
Physics software
Science software for Windows
Computer-related introductions in 1987
Data analysis software